Beaver Mountain is a  mountain summit in British Columbia, Canada.

Description

Beaver Mountain is located in the Battle Range of the Selkirk Mountains. The remote peak is situated southwest of the head of the Beaver River and is set on the southern boundary of Glacier National Park. Precipitation runoff from the mountain drains north into the headwaters of Beaver River, and south into Butters Creek which is a tributary of the Duncan River. Beaver Mountain is more notable for its steep rise above local terrain than for its absolute elevation.

History
The mountain was named in August 1890 by Harold Ward Topham of the Alpine Club of England, and Herr Emil Huber and Herr Carl Sultzer of the Swiss Alpine Club. The mountain is named in association with Beaver River, which in turn was named for the great number of beavers that once inhabited the valley. The mountain's toponym was officially adopted on July 29, 1904, by the Geographical Names Board of Canada. 

The first ascent of the summit was made August 25, 1913, by Edward W. D. Holway, Ernest Feus and Christian Häsler, Jr.

Climate

Based on the Köppen climate classification, Beaver Mountain is located in a subarctic climate zone with cold, snowy winters, and mild summers. Winter temperatures can drop below −20 °C with wind chill factors below −30 °C. This climate supports the Duncan Névé and Beaver Glacier on the north slope, and two smaller unnamed glaciers on the south slope of the peak.

See also
Geography of British Columbia

References

External links
 Glacier National Park: Parks Canada

Three-thousanders of British Columbia
Selkirk Mountains
Kootenay Land District
Glacier National Park (Canada)